The discography of Katharine McPhee consists of five studio albums, ten singles, ten music videos, and other miscellaneous songs and albums.

Albums

Studio albums

Appearances in other albums

Extended plays

Singles
 Sales under Sales column are for digital sales only
 Somewhere Over the Rainbow/My Destiny was also sold as a physical single, which sold 169,000 copies

Promotional singles
These songs charted from unsolicited airplay and/or sales on Billboard charts.

Miscellaneous songs
 Sales numbers under Sales column for songs are for digital sales only
 unk - Sales unknown
 n/a - Not applicable (not released for sale as a digital single under that album)

Charted songs

Other songs

Songwriter credits

Music videos

References

Discographies of American artists
American Idol discographies
Pop music discographies